The New What Next is the sixth full-length studio album by Hot Water Music. It was released by Epitaph in 2004. This was Hot Water Music's final release before temporarily disbanding in 2006, and their last new release until 2012's Exister.

Track listing

Personnel
Chuck Ragan - guitar, vocals
Chris Wollard - guitar, vocals
Jason Black - bass guitar
George Rebelo - drums

Hot Water Music albums
2004 albums
Epitaph Records albums